Campagnano di Roma is a  (municipality) in the Metropolitan City of Rome in the Italian region of Latium, located about  northwest of Rome. It was first mentioned in 1076, having been carved out of the great estate assembled on the Roman pattern by Pope Adrian I, ca. 780, his Domusculta Capracorum. In medieval times, Campagnano di Roma was on the via Francigena. Here, Sigeric, Archbishop of Canterbury, sojourned on his return journey from Rome about 990.

Campagnano di Roma borders the following municipalities: Anguillara Sabazia, Formello, Magliano Romano, Mazzano Romano, Nepi, Rome, Sacrofano, Trevignano Romano.

The Archaeological Park of Veii is nearby.

The town hosts the ACI Vallelunga Circuit racing circuit.

References

External links
 Official website

Cities and towns in Lazio